Edwin Joseph Fountain (21 September 1871 – 1946) was an English professional footballer born in Aston, which is now part of Birmingham, who played in the Football League for Small Heath. Fountain, a left-sided forward, struggled to compete with Fred Wheldon and Toddy Hands. He made his debut in the First Division on 9 February 1895 in a 1–1 draw at home to Sunderland, and played once more during that season and once towards the end of the next, before returning to local football in the Midlands area.

He married Emily Jane Payne in Birmingham on 21 December 1895. He died in 1946.

References

1871 births
1946 deaths
Footballers from Birmingham, West Midlands
English footballers
Association football forwards
Calthorpe F.C. players
Birmingham City F.C. players
Birmingham St George's F.C. players
Worcester City F.C. players
Hereford Town F.C. players
English Football League players
Date of death missing